Viola kitaibeliana, the dwarf violet, is a plant species in the genus Viola. It is native to a large area from the Canary Islands, across Europe, to northern Iran and southern Turkmenistan.

It is an annual, and requires disturbed or grazed soil to grow.

In 2021, two plants were discovered flowering on the 0.16 sq km island of Teän, in the Scilly Isles; the first seen there for 16 years.

Taxonomy
Besides the nominate taxon, there are two other infraspecific taxa which are recognised in Plants of the World Online as of 2017:
Viola kitaibeliana subsp. kitaibeliana
Viola kitaibeliana subsp. machadiana (Cout.) Capelo & C.Aguiar
Viola kitaibeliana subsp. trimestris (DC. ex Ging.) Espeut

Description
This herbaceous plant is not higher than 12 cm. Like all violets the flowers are zygomorphic.

References

kitaibeliana